Girl, Girl, Boy, Girl, Boy is the second studio album by Japanese J-Pop band Rumania Montevideo. It was released on January 26, 2000 by Giza Studio.

Background
The title of the album represents the members of the band - three "girls" (Mami, Akiko, Satomi) and two "boys" (Makoto, Kazunobu).

The album consist of three previously released singles, such as Digital Music Power, Picnic and Koisuru Betty. Koisuru Betty was released two weeks before the album.

B-side track Under the Skin from second single was included in this album as well.

Digital Music Power and Picnic were re-recorded from the original songs Snap and picnic which were performed in english and included in their first and second indies albums Jet Plane and Sunny, Cloudy, Rain.

Charting
The album reached #24 on Oricon in its first week and sold 13,410 copies. It charted for 2 weeks and sold 17,490 copies.

Track listing

Personnel
Credits adapted from the CD booklet of Girl, Girl, Boy, Girl, Boy.

Mami Miyoshi – vocals, songwriting, drums
Makoto Miyoshi - producer, guitar, arranging, composing
Satomi Makoshi - bass, backing vocals
Akiko Matsuda - keyboards, backing vocals
Kazunobu Mashima - guitar
Yoshinori Akai - recording, mixing, manipulating
Tatsuya Okada - assistant engineering
Secil Minami - backing vocals
Hirohito Furui (Garnet Crow) - keyboard, arranging
Keisuke Kurumatani (New Cinema Tokage) - drums
Aika Ohno – backing vocals
Nobuyasu Hirohara: organ
Maho Furukawa (4D-JAM): backing vocals
Takumi Ito: backing vocals
Gan Kojima – art direction
Rockaku - producing

In media
Digital Music Power: ending theme for Anime television series Monster Rancher
Picnic: opening theme for Anime television series Monster Rancher
Koisuru Betty: streaming song for older corners of Tokyo Broadcasting System Television program Express

References 

2000 albums
Being Inc. albums
Giza Studio albums
Japanese-language albums
Rumania Montevideo albums
Albums produced by Daiko Nagato